The Commonwealth men, Commonwealth's men, or Commonwealth Party were highly outspoken British Protestant religious, political, and economic reformers during the early 18th century. They were active in the movement called the Country Party.  They promoted republicanism and had a great influence on Republicanism in the United States, but little impact in Britain.

The most noted commonwealthmen were John Trenchard and Thomas Gordon, who wrote the seminal work Cato's Letters between 1720 and 1723. Other members include Robert Crowley, Henry Brinkelow, Thomas Beccon, Thomas Lever, and John Hales.  They condemned corruption and lack of morality in British political life, theorizing that only civic virtue could protect a country from despotism and ruin.

Their criticism about enclosure and the general material plight of the poor were particularly notable to early twentieth-century scholars like Richard Tawney who saw in them a valuable though regrettably abortive form of Christian socialism that represented a preferable alternative to the view of Max Weber that Protestantism enabled and sustained the rise of capitalism. On the other hand, it has been argued that the Commonwealth Men "by no means stand against an individualistic or capitalistic spirit, and--despite what [for example, historians JGA Pocock and Gordon Wood] have claimed--are far from espousing classical virtue or the Aristotelian conception of man as zoon politikon [a political animal]."

Although nearly all British politicians and thinkers rejected the ideas of the commonwealth men in the eighteenth century, these writers had a powerful effect on British colonial America. It is estimated that half the private libraries in the American Colonies held bound volumes of Cato's Letters on their shelves. 

Not to be confused with the Commonwealth Men of the middle of the 16th century.

References

Sources

 Trevor Colbourn, The Lamp of Experience: Whig History and the Intellectual Origins of the American Revolution (1965)
 Robbins, Caroline. The Eighteenth-Century Commonwealthman: Studies in the Transmission, Development, and Circumstance of English Liberal Thought from the Restoration of Charles II until the War with the Thirteen Colonies (1959, 2004).
 Bailyn, Bernard. The Ideological Origins of the American Revolution, (Cambridge MA, 1967).
 Middlekauff, Robert. The Glorious Cause: The American Revolution, 1763-1789, Revised and Expanded Edition (2005), Oxford University Press, 

Republicanism in the United Kingdom
1720s in Great Britain
1730s in Great Britain
1740s in Great Britain
1750s in Great Britain
Politics of the Kingdom of Great Britain